Joseph Robert Michel Perreault (January 28, 1931 – September 10, 1980) was a Canadian professional ice hockey player who played 31 games in the National Hockey League and 1 game in the World Hockey Association between 1955 and 1973. He played with the Detroit Red Wings, Boston Bruins, Montreal Canadiens, and Los Angeles Sharks.  He is the cousin of Gilbert Perreault.

Career statistics

Regular season and playoffs

References

External links
 

1931 births
1980 deaths
Boston Bruins players
Canadian ice hockey goaltenders
Des Moines Oak Leafs players
Detroit Red Wings players
Greensboro Generals (SHL) players
Hershey Bears players
Ice hockey people from Quebec
Los Angeles Sharks players
Montreal Canadiens players
Providence Reds players
Rochester Americans players
San Francisco Seals (ice hockey) players
Sportspeople from Trois-Rivières